The 1957 Humboldt State Lumberjacks football team represented Humboldt State College during the 1957 NCAA College Division football season. Humboldt State competed in the Far Western Conference (FWC).

The 1957 Lumberjacks were led by seventh-year head coach Phil Sarboe. They played home games at the Redwood Bowl in Arcata, California. Humboldt State finished with a record of four wins and six losses (4–6, 3–2 FWC). The Lumberjacks were outscored by their opponents 179–185 for the season. The 1957 season was the only losing season in the 15 years Phil Sarboe was the head coach for the Lumberjacks.

Schedule

Notes

References

Humboldt State
Humboldt State Lumberjacks football seasons
Humboldt State Lumberjacks football